MTV Pulse was a musical pop/rock television channel owned by MTV Networks France, launched in November 2005 only for France, dedicated to young adult (15–35 years) audience. MTV Pulse broadcast pop and rock music videos (also metal, punk, soul, alternative rock, etc.), live performances, interviews and special programs entirely dedicated to this musical universe.

The clips were broadcast in a more commercial format and from the currents of alternative music.

From April 9, 2013, the channel was available in HD.

MTV Pulse ceased broadcasting in France on 17 November 2015, along with MTV Base and MTV Idol, to be replaced by French version of MTV Hits and the new My MTV service.

External links 
MTV Pulse France - presentation, screenshots

MTV channels
Television channels and stations established in 2005
Television channels and stations disestablished in 2015
Defunct television channels in France
2005 establishments in France
2015 disestablishments in France
Music organizations based in France